The quena (hispanicized spelling of Quechua qina, sometimes also written kena in English) is the traditional flute of the Andes. Traditionally made of cane or wood, it has 6 finger holes and one thumb hole, and is open on both ends or the bottom is half-closed (choked). To produce sound, the player closes the top end of the pipe with the flesh between the chin and lower lip, and blows a stream of air downward, along the axis of the pipe, over an elliptical notch cut into the end. It is normally in the key of G, with G4 being the lowest note. It produces a very "textured" and "dark" timbre because of the length-to-bore ratio of about 16 to 20 (subsequently causing difficulty in the upper register), which is very unlike the tone of the Western concert flute with a length-to-bore ratio of about 38 to 20.

The quenacho (also "kenacho" in English) is a greater, lower-toned version of the quena and made the same way. It is in the key of D, with D4 being the lowest note, a perfect fourth lower than the quena. It produces a very rich timbre because of the length-to-bore ratio of about 25, paradoxically brighter by comparison to the quena.

The quena is mostly used in traditional Andean music. In the 1960s and 1970s the quena was used by several nueva canción musicians. This use was in most cases for particular songs and not as a standard instrument, but some groups such as Illapu and virtuoso player Facio Santillan have used it regularly. In the 1980s and 1990s some post-nueva canción rock groups have also incorporated the quena in some of their songs; notably Soda Stereo in Cuando Pase el Temblor and Los Enanitos Verdes in Lamento Boliviano. The quena is also relatively common in world music.

Other Andean instruments similar to the quena
Other Andean flutes include the following:
The pinkillu has the same fingering as the quena, and is similar in appearance and operation to a recorder. Unlike the actual quena, it has an air channel or fipple to conduct the air;
The tarka (or tharqa), which also operates like a recorder but is comparatively shorter and quite angular in shape, requires greater breath, and has a darker, more penetrating sound;
The moseño (originally mohoseño), is a long, dual-tube bamboo flute with a deep sound. The auxiliary tube acts as an aeroduct.

See also
Native American flute
Shakuhachi, a similar Japanese end-blown flute

References

External links

Quenas with embouchures made of ebony and other woods
Quena music
Modern Quena models
How to select a quena
The sound of the quena Los Koyas
Quenacho Music Iain Kelso

End-blown flutes
Andean music
Aymara
Bamboo flutes

sr:Кена